The Grand Prix François Faber is a one-day road cycling race held annually in Luxembourg since 1918. Originally held as a stage race, it was created in honor of the Luxembourg cyclist François Faber who killed during World War I.

Winners

References

External links

Cycle races in Luxembourg
1918 establishments in Luxembourg
Recurring sporting events established in 1918